Nicomedes  may refer to:
Nicomedes (mathematician), ancient Greek mathematician who discovered the conchoid
Nicomedes of Sparta, regent during the youth of King Pleistoanax, commanded the Spartan army at the Battle of Tanagra (457 BC)
Saint Nicomedes, Martyr of unknown era, whose feast is observed 15 September

Four kings of Bithynia in Anatolia, 3rd–1st century BC:
Nicomedes I of Bithynia, ruled 278–255 BC
Nicomedes II of Bithynia, 149–127 BC
Nicomedes III of Bithynia, 127–94 BC
Nicomedes IV of Bithynia, 94–74 BC